Gryllotalpa is a genus of insects in the mole cricket family Gryllotalpidae.

Species
The Orthoptera Species File lists a number species, including cryptic species groups (indicated with a * and often distinguished only by song patterns).  They include:
 species group* Gryllotalpa africana Palisot de Beauvois, 1805 — Africa
 species group* Gryllotalpa australis Erichson, 1842 includes:
 Gryllotalpa brachyptera Tindale, 1928 — Australia
 Gryllotalpa breviabdominis Ma & Zhang, 2011
 Gryllotalpa chiliensis Saussure, 1861
 Gryllotalpa chinensis Westwood, 1838
 Gryllotalpa choui Ma & Zhang, 2010
 Gryllotalpa cophta (Haan, 1844)
 Gryllotalpa cultriger Uhler, 1864 — Mexico
 Gryllotalpa cycloptera Ma & Zhang, 2011
 Gryllotalpa dentista Yang, 1995
 Gryllotalpa formosana Shiraki, 1930 — Taiwan
 Gryllotalpa fraser Tan & Kamaruddin, 2013
 Gryllotalpa fulvipes Saussure, 1877
 Gryllotalpa fusca Chopard, 1930
 Gryllotalpa gorkhana Ingrisch, 2006
 Gryllotalpa gracilis Chopard, 1930
 species group* Gryllotalpa gryllotalpa (Linnaeus, 1758) includes:
 Gryllotalpa septemdecimchromosomica Ortiz, 1958
 Gryllotalpa unispina Saussure, 1874
 Gryllotalpa vineae Bennet-Clark, 1970
 Gryllotalpa henana Cai & Niu, 1998
 Gryllotalpa hirsuta Burmeister, 1838
 Gryllotalpa howensis Tindale, 1928
 Gryllotalpa insulana Chopard, 1954
 Gryllotalpa jinxiuensis You & Li, 1990
 Gryllotalpa krishnani Arun Prasanna, Anbalagan, Pandiarajan, Dinakaran & Krishnan, 2012
 Gryllotalpa mabiana Ma, Xu & Takeda, 2008
 Gryllotalpa madecassa (Chopard, 1920)
 Gryllotalpa major Saussure, 1874 — USA
 species group* Gryllotalpa monanka Otte & Alexander, 1983 — USA, Australia
 Gryllotalpa maroccana Baccetti, 1987
 Gryllotalpa minuta Burmeister, 1838
 †Gryllotalpa miocaenica Zeuner, 1931
 Gryllotalpa nitens Ingrisch, 2006
 Gryllotalpa nymphicus Tan, 2012
 Gryllotalpa obscura Chopard, 1966
 Gryllotalpa orientalis Burmeister, 1838 — Asia and Australia
 Gryllotalpa ornata Walker, 1869
 species group* Gryllotalpa oya Tindale, 1928 — Australia
 species group* Gryllotalpa parva Townsend, 1983 — Africa
 species group* Gryllotalpa pilosipes Tindale, 1928 — Australia
 species group* Gryllotalpa pluvialis (Mjöberg, 1913) — Australia
 Gryllotalpa permai Tan & Kamaruddin, 2016
 Gryllotalpa pygmaea Ingrisch, 1990
 Gryllotalpa wallace Tan, 2012
 Gryllotalpa wudangensis Li, Ma & Xu, 2007

References

External links

Mole Cricket Knowledge Base at UF IFAS

Gryllotalpidae
Ensifera genera
Taxonomy articles created by Polbot